Dr. William Foster, also known as Black Goliath, Giant-Man and Goliath, is a fictional character, a superhero appearing in American comic books published by Marvel Comics. He is a professor with powers similar to Hank Pym's increasing size and mass to gigantic proportions.

The character has made several video game appearances and appeared in the Marvel Cinematic Universe film Ant-Man and the Wasp (2018), portrayed by Laurence Fishburne.

Publication history
Dr. Foster was created by Stan Lee and Don Heck in The Avengers #32 (Sept. 1966). His "Black Goliath" persona was created by Tony Isabella and George Tuska in Luke Cage, Power Man #24 (April 1975). Foster became the second Giant-Man in Marvel Two-in-One #55 (Sept. 1979). He became yet the fourth Goliath in The Thing vol. 2 #1 (Jan. 2006).

He starred in the five-issue series Black Goliath in 1976.

Bill Foster has appeared in the pages of various comic books, including The Avengers, Power Man, Marvel Two-in-One, The Champions, The Defenders, Marvel Super-Heroes (vol. 3), Marvel Comics Presents, and Civil War.

The character was killed by Ragnarok in the fourth issue of the series Civil War.

Fictional character biography

Origin
Bill Foster was born in Watts, Los Angeles, California. After earning a Ph.D. in biochemistry from the California Institute of Technology (Caltech), Dr. Foster worked in the Plans and Research Division for Tony Stark's Baltimore factory. He is hired to be the biochemical laboratory assistant of Dr. Henry "Hank" Pym. Foster continues to work as Pym's lab assistant. Foster later investigates the apparent deaths of Pym and Janet van Dyne.

Black Goliath

Dr. Foster moves to the West Coast and acquires the formula to "Pym particles" which give him the ability to grow in size like his former employer. Taking the name "Black Goliath", he helps Power Man fight the Circus of Crime. He later battles the original Atom-Smasher, the second Vulcan, and Stilt-Man. The mercenary Warhawk kills Atom-Smasher and flees before Black Goliath can catch him.

Black Goliath later assists the Champions of Los Angeles in battling Stilt-Man, then joins the group part-time as their technical advisor. Alongside Ben Grimm, Black Goliath battles the Hijacker. After the Champions disband, Black Goliath and a large group of other heroes attend a Defenders membership rally; this incarnation of Defenders battles a number of assembled superhuman criminals for only one mission before disbanding.

Giant-Man

The Project: Pegasus Saga
Dr. Bill Foster later joins the staff of Project Pegasus, the U.S. government's semi-secret energy research facility, as a biochemical researcher. While there, he reveals his Black Goliath identity to the Thing working (at the time) in security for Project: Pegasus. In the process of answering an emergency alarm, Foster decides to change his alias to the name "Giant-Man" at Ben Grimm's suggestion. Alongside the Thing, Quasar, and the Aquarian, Giant-Man defends Project: Pegasus against Nuklo, the Grapplers, Klaw, Solarr, and the Nth Man. After working at Project: Pegasus for a short time, Foster reveals that he is dying from radiation poisoning he contracted in his earlier fight with Atom-Smasher.

Alongside the Thing and Iceman, he battles the Circus of Crime again. Alongside the Thing and Captain America, he battles MODOK and A.I.M. Alongside the Thing and Spider-Woman, Giant-Man battles the second Atom-Smasher. Foster's radiation poisoning takes a turn for the worse and he lies on his death bed. As Spider-Woman is immune to radiation at the time, Foster is given a blood transfusion from Spider-Woman. The process cures his radiation poisoning, but ends Spider-Woman's radiation immunity, and removes Giant-Man's powers as well.

Evolutionary War
Bill Foster is next seen during the Evolutionary War. He is a scientist working for the High Evolutionary at his base in the Savage Land. After discovering the High Evolutionary's plans for a genetic bomb, Foster sends a distress message to the West Coast Avengers. Mockingbird, Tigra, and Moon Knight are the only Avengers to answer his summons and join him in destroying the base. Foster reveals that he had been suffering from cancer since his last appearance. He retakes an improved growth serum, which adds clean (cancer-free) mass to his body, so he remains at giant-size until he can receive further treatment. This was the last mention of Foster's cancer. Giant-Man later defeats Doctor Nemesis and Erik Josten in their scheme.

Abandoning the hero role
Bill Foster soon gives up the Giant-Man identity to which Hank Pym subsequently takes back for himself. Not too long after that, Josten's ionic powers are disrupted in a battle against the West Coast Avengers. This causes an energy disruption which allows a race of extra-dimensional creatures, the Kosmosians, to attack Earth. Although the creatures are ultimately repelled, the energy disruption and effects on the Pym Particles affect all that have ever been exposed to them, except Pym himself, causing them to lose control of their growth and/or shrinking powers. During this storyline, it was shown how Foster and Pym were trying to use Pym Particles to end world hunger.

After losing his powers, Dr. Foster joins the Centers for Disease Control's staff. In this capacity, he helps the Avengers deal with a bio-weapon released near Mount Rushmore.

Final return
Bill Foster somehow regained his powers. Under his Black Goliath identity, he appears very briefly as part of an ad-hoc team of "urban" superheroes (Luke Cage, Iron Fist, Brother Voodoo and the Falcon).

Foster dons the Goliath identity without the "black" in the name and along with a new costume to first help the Thing deal with a supervillain (along with hitting up for a research grant), then helps Spider-Man track down the Hulk in order for Bruce Banner to possibly deal with Spider-Man's cellular degeneration.

Civil War
When the Civil War breaks out, Bill Foster as Goliath is seen as a member of Captain America's anti-registration Secret Avengers, adopting the alias Rockwell Dodsworth. He subsequently appears briefly amongst the cavalcade of other super-heroes attending the Black Panther's and Storm's wedding.

Foster is killed by a clone of Thor during a battle between the Secret Avengers and Iron Man's pro-registration forces. Foster is buried as a giant, with Iron Man paying for the thirty-eight burial plots required to accommodate his body. His death affected the war's balance of forces, leading several characters to switch sides, such as Spider-Man defecting to Captain America's side.

Legacy
Bill's nephew, M.I.T. student Tom Foster, informs the Black Panther of intending to follow in his uncle's footsteps by cracking the Pym Particle formula and being a hero. Tom later publicly denounced Reed Richards and Iron Man because of his uncle's death. Afterwards, Tom recreates and drinks his uncle's formula.

During the "Dark Reign" storyline, Norman Osborn dug up Foster's grave and removed his clavicle, hoping to use the Pym particle residue to track down Hank Pym's Mighty Avengers. Foster's clavicle is later broken in half by Osborn in a fit of rage after hearing Pym's team being declared "the real Avengers" on national television.

When Hercules ventures into the Underworld, Bill Foster is one of numerous deceased characters seen in Erebus: the place in between life and death where those who feel they still have business in the mortal world gamble and linger for their resurrection.

It is later revealed that Foster had worked with Hank on a virtual reality program where one could upload their consciousness and live on after death prior to his own death. The grieving Pym uploaded Foster's mind into the program, in effect creating a virtual Utopia for his comrade. A.I.M. later attempt to hijack the program, but Pym was able to defeat them with Eric O'Grady's help. During the adventure's course, O'Grady (disguised as Pym in the virtual world) converses briefly with Foster who says to stop pushing loved ones away.

Powers and abilities
Bill Foster's superpowers are a result of his biochemical formula containing Pym particles that he ingested. He has the ability to increase his size into gigantic levels by psionically drawing mass from an extra-dimensional source, while gaining immense strength and durability in this height. The extra mass returns to its source as he decreases in size. The process of height alteration is fatiguing, making Foster more vulnerable to harm, after successive changes.

Bill Foster possesses a gifted intellect with an extensive knowledge of biochemistry.

Other versions

Spidey Super Stories
An alternate version of Bill Foster appeared in Spidey Super Stories as Giant-Man. In the story, it was explained that Foster was originally the young lab assistant of Hank Pym, and became the second Giant-Man after he retired.

What If?
In What If Civil War Ended Differently?, Bill Foster is featured in both stories. In "What If Captain America Led All the Heroes Against the Registration Act," Bill Foster appears on Captain America's side. In "What If Iron Man Lost the Civil War," Bill Foster is among the heroes on both sides that fight an out-of-control Ragnarok. When Ragnarok is about to use a lightning attack on Bill Foster, Iron Man threw himself in front of the attack.

Contest of Champions
The 2015 Contest of Champions series featured an unidentified alternate reality's version of Civil War that had everything go in Tony Stark's favor. He used the Reality Infinity Gem to undo the death of Goliath at the hands of Ragnarok.

Marvel Zombies
A zombified Black Goliath attacks the fortress of Doctor Doom known as "Doomshadt" in Marvel Zombies vs. The Army of Darkness #4. He is repelled by Doom's forces as he is impaled by several large missiles and killed when they explode while still within him. A different zombified Black Goliath shows up in Marvel Zombies Return. He had been decapitated and his still 'living' zombie head is used as part of a makeshift computer to allow the zombified Hank Pym to create dimensional travel. This Goliath is destroyed in an attack by human-friendly forces.

MC2
In the MC2 universe, in the pages of A-Next, Bill Foster is seen within the series as his son John Foster becomes the new Earth Sentry.

Ant-Man Season One
A younger version of Foster appears in the Ant-Man: Season One graphic novel. He is portrayed as the lab assistant of the young Hank Pym, and helps him in his crusade against Egghead.

In other media

Film

Bill Foster appears in the Marvel Cinematic Universe (MCU) film Ant-Man and the Wasp, primarily portrayed by Laurence Fishburne, while his younger self is portrayed by Laurence's son Langston. This version is a former member of S.H.I.E.L.D., Hank Pym's assistant on "Project Goliath", and Ava Starr's surrogate father after Elihas Starr's death. In the present, Foster teaches quantum physics at UC Berkeley when he encounters Pym, Scott Lang, and Hope van Dyne. After Ava captures them, Foster explains his intent to cure Ava of her quantum instability by obtaining energy from the Quantum Realm. After Pym, Lang, and Hope escape, Foster and Ava steal Pym's lab, but their former captives retake it. After Janet van Dyne stabilizes Ava, Foster goes on the run with the latter.

Video games
 Bill Foster as Goliath appears as a boss in Marvel: Ultimate Alliance 2, voiced by Emerson Brooks. This version is an ally of Captain America in opposing the Superhuman Registration Act.
 Bill Foster as Goliath appears as a playable character in Marvel Super Hero Squad Online.
 Bill Foster as Black Goliath appears as a playable character in Lego Marvel's Avengers, voiced by James C. Mathis III.

Miscellaneous
Bill Foster appears in the first issue of The Avengers: United They Stand tie-in comic book. This version was Henry Pym's lab assistant.

References

External links
 Goliath at Marvel.com

African-American superheroes
Characters created by Don Heck
Characters created by George Tuska
Characters created by Stan Lee
Characters created by Tony Isabella
Comics characters introduced in 1966
Fictional biochemists
Fictional California Institute of Technology people
Fictional characters from Los Angeles
Fictional characters who can change size
Fictional characters with superhuman durability or invulnerability
Male characters in film
Marvel Comics American superheroes
Marvel Comics characters with superhuman strength
Marvel Comics male characters
Marvel Comics mutates
Marvel Comics scientists
Marvel Comics titles
Superhero film characters